Modern Fiction Studies is a peer-reviewed academic journal established in 1955 at Purdue University's Department of English, where it is still edited. It publishes general and themed issues on the topic of modernist and contemporary fiction using original research from literary scholars. It seeks to challenge and expand the perception of "modern fiction". Special issues may focus on a specific topic or author. For example, previous issues have featured Toni Morrison and J. R. R. Tolkien. The journal also includes book reviews. The current editor in chief is John N. Duvall (Purdue University). The journal is published by Johns Hopkins University Press and appears quarterly in March, June, September, and December. Circulation is 2,265 and the average length of an issue is 284 pages.

Abstracting and indexing
This journal is indexed and abstracted by the following services:
Arts & Humanities Citation Index
Current Contents - Arts & Humanities
SCOPUS

See also
 Modernist literature

References

External links 
 
MFS on the JHU Press website
 MFS  at Project MUSE

Literary magazines published in the United States
Modernism
Publications established in 1955
Quarterly journals
English-language journals
Johns Hopkins University Press academic journals
1955 establishments in Indiana
Purdue University